John Ailleston (or Ayleston) (fl. 1410s - 1410s) was a Canon of Windsor from 1404 to 1405

Career

He was appointed:
Prebendary of the third stall in St Stephen's, Westminster 1404 - 1414
Vicar of Leverington, Cambridgeshire 1414
Prebendary of Newark College, Leicester 1405
Rector of Towcester 1408 - 1414
Rector of Stanwell, Middlesex 1408 - 1414
Master of St Mary’s Hospital, Chichester 1412
Rector of Worthen, Shropshire 1412
Prebendary of Ely 1414

He was appointed to the sixth stall in St George's Chapel, Windsor Castle in 1404 and held the canonry until 1405.

Notes 

Canons of Windsor